Antonia Samudio (born 27 March 2001) is a Colombian tennis player.

Samudio has a career-high singles ranking by the Women's Tennis Association (WTA) of 938, achieved on 11 November 2019. She also has a career-high WTA doubles ranking of 805, achieved on 2 March 2020.

Samudio made her WTA Tour main-draw debut at the 2021 Copa Colsanitas, where she received a wildcard into the doubles tournament partnering Jessica Plazas.

ITF Circuit finals

Doubles: 6 (1 title, 5 runner–ups)

References

External links
 
 

2001 births
Living people
Colombian female tennis players
21st-century Colombian women